Astropyga nuptialis is a species of sea urchins of the family Diadematidae. Their armour is covered with spines. Astropyga nuptialis was first scientifically described in 1958 by Tommasi.

References

Animals described in 1958
Diadematidae